"Faster" is a song by Matt Nathanson recorded for his album Modern Love. The song reached number seventy-four on the Billboard Hot 100 and number thirty-one on the Pop Songs chart also published by Billboard.(see charts)

Charts
"Faster" debuted on the Bubbling Under Hot 100 at number twenty-four in its first charting week. It fell off the chart, but returned several weeks later at number ten. The week after that, it broke into the Billboard Hot 100 at number ninety-nine. It has since reached number seventy-four, becoming Matt Nathanson's second top 75 hit. After falling from number seventy-four to number eighty-five, due to many new entries from Lil Wayne's Tha Carter IV, and falling to number ninety-four within the next three weeks. It has rebounded to number eighty-five, where it stayed for an additional two weeks. It has since fallen off after 13 weeks on the chart.

Weekly charts

Year-end charts

References

Matt Nathanson songs
2011 singles
2011 songs
Vanguard Records singles
Song recordings produced by Marshall Altman